Streetlife is the second studio album by German-based Eurodance group Sqeezer. It was released by Akropolis Music in association with EMI Electrola in 1998.

Track listing

Charts

References

1998 albums
Sqeezer albums